Henny Ingemar Meijer (born 17 February 1962) is a Dutch former footballer who played as a forward.

Meijer was born in Paramaribo, Suriname. He is known for scoring the first ever J1 League goal in the 19th minute of a game against Yokohama Marinos on 15 May 1993.

Career statistics

Club

International

References

External links
 
 
 

1962 births
Living people
Sportspeople from Paramaribo
Association football forwards
Dutch footballers
Dutch expatriate footballers
Eredivisie players
Eerste Divisie players
AFC Ajax players
SC Cambuur players
De Graafschap players
FC Groningen players
SC Heerenveen players
Roda JC Kerkrade players
SC Telstar players
SC Veendam players
FC Volendam players
J1 League players
Tokyo Verdy players
Expatriate footballers in Japan
Dutch expatriate sportspeople in Japan
Netherlands international footballers
Surinamese emigrants to the Netherlands